Legislative elections were held in Mayotte on 9 and 16 March 2008 as part of the 2008 French municipal elections. The Union for a Popular Movement emerged as the largest party, winning eight of the nineteen seats.

Results

References

2008 in Mayotte
Elections in Mayotte
Mayotte
March 2008 events in Africa
Election and referendum articles with incomplete results